Map of places in Falkirk council area compiled from this list
See the list of places in Scotland for places in other counties.
The article is a list of links for any town, village, hamlet, castle, golf course, historic house, hillfort, lighthouse, nature reserve, reservoir, river or other place of interest in the Falkirk council area of Scotland.

A
Abbotshaugh Community Woodland
Airth, Airth Castle
Allandale
Antonine Wall
Avon Gorge
Avonbridge

B
Bainsford
Banknock
Binniehill
Birkhill Caverns, Birkhill railway station 
Black Loch
Blackness, Blackness Castle
Bo'ness, Bo'ness and Kinneil Railway, Bo'ness Motor Museum, Bo'ness railway station
Bonny Water
Bonnybridge
Braes villages
Brightons

C
California
Callendar House, Callendar Park
Camelon, Camelon Fort, Camelon railway station
Carron, Carron Company
Carronshore
Castle Cary Castle
Clackmannanshire Bridge

D
Denny
Dennyloanhead
Dunipace
Dunmore, Dunmore Pineapple

E
Elphinstone Tower

F
Falkirk, Battle of Falkirk, Battle of Falkirk Muir, Falkirk Golf Club, Falkirk Grahamston railway station, Falkirk High railway station, Falkirk Old Parish Church, Falkirk Stadium, Falkirk Steeple, Falkirk Wheel
Fankerton
Forth & Clyde Canal

G
Glen Village
Glensburgh
Grangemouth, Grangemouth Docks, Grangemouth Refinery
Greenhill

H
Haggs
Head of Muir
The Helix
High Bonnybridge
Hippodrome Cinema
Hallglen

K
Kincardine Bridge
Kinneil House, Kinneil railway station

L
Langlees
Larbert, Larbert railway station
Laurieston
Letham
Limerigg
Loan
Longcroft

M
Maddiston
Middlefield
Muirhouses

O
Ochilview Park

P
Polmont, HMYOI Polmont, Polmont railway station

R
Redding
Reddingmuirhead
River Avon
River Carron
River Forth
Rough Castle Fort, Rough Castle Tunnel
Rumford

S
Shieldhill
Skinflats
Slamannan
South Alloa
St Andrew's West Church
Standburn
Stenhousemuir
Stoneywood

T
Tamfourhill
Torwood, Torwood Castle

U
Union Canal

W
Wallacestone
Westquarter
Whitecross
Woodlands

See also

List of places in Scotland

Falkirk (council area)
Geography of Falkirk (council area)
Lists of places in Scotland
Populated places in Scotland